126 Madison Avenue (also known as 15 East 30th Street and Madison House) is a residential skyscraper under development by Fosun Property in NoMad, Manhattan, New York City. J.D. Carisle Development Corp. is co-developing the project with Fosun Group, while Handel Architects is the architect. Construction began in 2017.

History
J.D. Carlisle purchased the building's site for $102 million in March 2015 with plans to build a 53 story residential building. The developers received $350 million in construction financing from Bank OZK in May 2018. The structure topped out in June 2019.

References 

Condominiums and housing cooperatives in Manhattan
Fifth Avenue
Madison Avenue
Midtown Manhattan
Residential buildings in Manhattan
Residential condominiums in New York City